Ethmia comoriensis is a moth in the family Depressariidae. It is found on the Comoros off the eastern coast of Africa.

The larvae feed on Uncaria rhynchophylla.

References

Moths described in 1963
comoriensis
Moths of the Comoros
Endemic fauna of the Comoros